Rapid Central Station (also known as the Transit Center) is an intermodal transit station in downtown Grand Rapids, Michigan. It is operated by the Interurban Transit Partnership and serves as Grand Rapids' main city bus station as well as a station on the Silver Line bus rapid transit. It is located on Grandville Avenue between Cherry Street and Wealthy Street, and is the BRT's northern terminus. It is just yards north of the city's intercity rail station, the Vernon J. Ehlers Station, on Century Avenue.

History
The station was built in 2004 at the cost of $22 million to serve as both a new bus station and a terminus for intercity coach routes such as Greyhound and Indian Trails. Greyhound moved its operations from 190 Wealthy Street SW on the corner of Grandville Avenue to be part of the intermodal station. It was the first transportation center in the US to receive LEED certification.

The year 2014 saw two major additions to the station. The Silver Line was completed in August adding a platform to the space between the building's eastern entrance and the coach bays. Just two months later, the city's Amtrak station opened at its new location 100 yards south of the bus station.
 
As Grand Rapids' major bus transfer point, the station features sixteen bays for city buses. Most bus transfers are made on the central platform, while access to the BRT and the Greyhound/Indian Trails coaches is from the station building to the west.

An information desk and ticket counter for the Rapid is located inside the station building, along with similar facilities for Greyhound services. There is also a small snack shop, cafe and vending machines. Outside of information desk hours, ticket machines inside the building or on the central platform dispense any Rapid tickets that cannot be purchased on the buses, such as monthly passes or BRT fares.

Local service

Service operates based on a mass arrival and departure system known locally as the "line-up". The regular routes 1-16 and 18 all operate around the framework of quarter-hourly arrivals and departures. On weekdays, major routes depart at :15 and :45, while others depart at :00 and :30 during the day before reverting to :15 or :45 timings in the evenings. Incoming buses are scheduled to arrive around 7–10 minutes prior to their scheduled departure.

The final "line-up", or departure, of the day is delayed until all participating buses have arrived and any transferring passengers have reached their desired vehicle.

Inter-city service

Amtrak schedules:
Indian Trails schedules:
Greyhound schedules:

References

External links

Bus stations in Michigan
Buildings and structures in Grand Rapids, Michigan
Transportation in Grand Rapids, Michigan
Transportation buildings and structures in Kent County, Michigan